Rapidithrix thailandica is a bacterium from the genus of Rapidithrix which has been isolated from the coastline from the Andaman Sea in Thailand. Rapidithrix thailandica produces an antibacterial amino phenyl pyrrolidone.

References

External links
Type strain of Rapidithrix thailandica at BacDive -  the Bacterial Diversity Metadatabase
Type strain of Rapidithrix thailandica at BacDive -  the Bacterial Diversity Metadatabase

Further reading 
 
 

Sphingobacteriia
Bacteria described in 2007